Daytona International Speedway has seen 40 on-track fatalities since its opening in 1959: 23 car drivers, twelve motorcyclists, three go-kart drivers, one powerboat racer, and one track worker.  The most notable death may have been that of Dale Earnhardt, who was killed on the last lap of the Daytona 500 on February 18, 2001.

References

External links 
In memoriam at The Florida Times-Union's website
Auto-racing Fatalities list at USA Today's website
Motorsport Memorial

Florida sports-related lists
Lists of motorsport fatalities at race tracks in the United States
Motorsport in Daytona Beach, Florida
NASCAR-related lists